Transfer is a 2010 German science fiction/drama film directed by Damir Lukacevic. The film premiered at the 2010 Austin Fantastic Fest, and opened in German theatres on 22 September 2011.

Cast 
 B. J. Britt as Apolain / Hermann
 Regine Nehy as Sarah / Anna
 Ingrid Andree as Anna
 Hans-Michael Rehberg as Hermann
 Mehmet Kurtuluş as Laurin
 Eric P. Caspar as Werner
 Jeanette Hain as Dr. Menzel
  as Dr. Menzel senior
 Zana Marjanović as Dr. Menzel's assistant

References

External links 

2010s science fiction drama films
Films about consciousness transfer
German science fiction drama films
2010s German-language films
2010s German films